Rayko Nikolov Aleksiev (7 March 1893 – 18 November 1944) was a Bulgarian painter, caricaturist, and writer of feuilletons. He established Shturets, a hugely successful satirical newspaper, in 1932.

Known for his uncompromising satire, Aleksiev was especially disliked by  Bulgarian communists due to his famous caricatures of Joseph Stalin. After the Bulgarian coup d'état of 1944 he was, like many other intellectuals, arrested by the newly formed people's militia. While under arrest, he was severely beaten over the course of several days. He died from his wounds. Aleksiev was posthumously sentenced to death by the People's Court.

Honours

Aleksiev Glacier on Nordenskjöld Coast in Graham Land, Antarctica is named after Rayko Aleksiev.

Caricature Gallery

Sources

1893 births
1944 deaths
20th-century Bulgarian painters
20th-century Bulgarian male artists
Bulgarian caricaturists
Bulgarian cartoonists
Bulgarian satirists
People from Pazardzhik
Macedonian Bulgarians
20th-century Macedonian painters
People murdered in Bulgaria
Bulgarian murder victims
People executed by the People's Republic of Bulgaria
Male painters